The Flirtations may refer to:
 The Flirtations (group), with pro-LGBT themes, active in the late 1980s and early 1990s
 The Flirtations (R&B musical group), all-women group performing R&B and soul from 1960–present

See also
 Flirting